Retrovirology is a peer-reviewed open access scientific journal covering basic research on retroviruses. The editors-in-chief are Johnson Mak (Griffith University, Australia) and Susan Ross (University of Illinois at Chicago); earlier, Kuan-Teh Jeang was editor-in-chief.

Abstracting and indexing 
The journal is abstracted and indexed in:

According to the Journal Citation Reports, the journal has a 2019 impact factor of 4.183, ranking it 10th out of 37 journals in the category "Virology".

References

External links

Virology journals
Creative Commons Attribution-licensed journals
BioMed Central academic journals
English-language journals
Publications established in 2004